Pleasant Hill Church may refer to:

in the United States
(by state then city)
Pleasant Hill Presbyterian Church, Pleasant Hill, Alabama
Pleasant Hill Methodist Church, Pleasant Hill, Arkansas
Pleasant Hill Baptist Church, Paulding County, Georgia
Pleasant Hill Church (Clinton, Indiana)
Pleasant Hill United Church of Christ, Pleasant Hill, Ohio